Ersan Keleş (also known as Ersan Keles in Belgium) (born January 12, 1987) is a Turkish-Belgian futsal player.  He currently plays for Paraske Bowl Morlanwelz and previously played for Charleroi Action 21.

He is a member of the Turkey national futsal team in the UEFA Futsal Championship.

References

External links 
 Player profile at club page 
 Profile at futsalteam.com

1987 births
Living people
Turkish men's futsal players
Belgian people of Turkish descent